Francis Ochieng (born 9 December 1982) is a Kenyan former footballer who played as a goalkeeper.

Career
Ochieng played club football for Mumias Sugar, Tusker, Ulinzi Stars and Kangemi United.

He earned four caps for the Kenyan national team.

References

1982 births
Living people
Kenyan footballers
Kenya international footballers
Mumias Sugar F.C. players
Tusker F.C. players
Ulinzi Stars F.C. players
Kangemi United F.C. players
Association football goalkeepers